The Westgate Water Tower, also known as the Lincoln Water Tower is a historic water tower, dating to AD 1911. It is located on Westgate, in Lincoln, England. It is a grade II listed building.

History
It was designed by Reginald Blomfield in the Baroque revival style. The tower is square in plan and measures  in height. It was commissioned by the Lincoln Corporation in response to an outbreak of typhoid in the city in 1904-1905 which killed 113 people and drew water from the reservoir at Bracebridge Heath rather than from the polluted supplies at Hartsholme Lake and the River Witham.

The tank inside the tower measures  in diameter and can hold 1.356 million litres of water. It is still in use and is operated by Anglian Water.

References

Grade II listed buildings in Lincolnshire
Towers in Lincolnshire
Towers completed in 1911
Water towers in the United Kingdom
Buildings and structures in Lincoln, England